The Militsiya of the Republic of Belarus is a law enforcement agency in Belarus responsible for regular policing duties in the country.

History
The original Belarusian Militsiya was founded on 4 March 1917 during the events of the February Revolution, when prominent Bolshevik leader and politician Mikhail Frunze was appointed temporary police chief of the local Minsk civilian militia. Just three days later, various Belarusian cities began the process of creating police departments. The provisional regulations on the police were issued on 17 April 1917, establishing the Militsiya as an executive body of state power. In Belarus, as well as in newly formed Russian SFSR as a whole, the Militsiya replaced the previous Tsarist police services such as the Okhrana. On 10 November (28 October, O.S.) 1917, days after the October Revolution took place, the People's Commissariat for Internal Affairs (NKVD) issued a decree on the first normative act defining the creation of the Soviet Militsiya. 

A single police structure was developed for the Socialist Soviet Republic of Byelorussia in 1919, which enabled on 30 November 1920 in the form of the Main Police Administration of the BSSR. In July 1934, the NKVD took up secret police duties in the Belarusian SSR, with duties being transferred to the BSSR's Interior Ministry in March 1946. In early February 1962, law enforcement was handled solely by Soviet Belarusian authorities instead of the national agency. On 1 March 1991, the Supreme Soviet of Belarus enacted the Law "On the Police", which is the main legal act regulating the activities of the internal affairs bodies of an independent republic. On 17 July 2007, the National Assembly of Belarus adopted a law effectively making the Belarusian police a fundamental and flagship agency of the MVD/MUS. 4 March is today considered the birthday of the modern Belarusian police service.

Structure

Its law enforcement central agency, the Militsiya, is considered to be the main policing and law enforcement agency in Belarus, consisting of services such as:

 National Police Headquarters
 Criminal Police
 Central Department of Criminal Investigation
 Central Department for Combatting Economic Crimes
 Department for Drug Control and Trafficking in Human Beings Combatting
 Public Security Police
 Central Department for Law and Order Ensuring and Prevention of Crimes
 Department of State Traffic Police
 Department of Daily On-Duty Service
 Regional affiliates
 Minsk City Police Department
 Brest City Police Department
 Gomel City Police Department
 Mogilev City Police Department
 Vitebsk City Police Department
 Educational Institutions
 The Academy of the Ministry of Internal Affairs of the Republic of Belarus
 The Mogilev Institute of the Ministry of Internal Affairs
 Centre for Professional Development of Executives and Specialists of the Ministry of Internal Affairs
 Minsk City Cadet College № 1

Police ranks 

Officers

Cadets

Enlisted

Gallery

See also
Police of Russia
National Police of Ukraine

References

External links

Law enforcement agencies of Belarus
Government agencies established in 1917
1917 establishments in Russia
Government agencies established in 1991
1991 establishments in Belarus
Belarus